Dhoondte Reh Jaoge is a 2009 Indian comedy film directed by Umesh Shukla and produced by UTV Motion Pictures. The film stars Kunal Khemu, Paresh Rawal, Sonu Sood, Soha Ali Khan, Dilip Joshi and Johnny Lever. It was released on 6 March 2009 in India, and 20 March 2009, in the United States. The film is directed by Umesh Shukla and produced by Ronnie Screwvala. The music was composed by duo Sajid–Wajid.

Plot

Set in Mumbai, the film starts with Raj Chopra (Paresh Rawal), a good-for-nothing movie director whose recent films, have all failed at the box office. He gets threatened by his landlord and creditors that if he does not pay them on time, he will be homeless. At the same time, chartered accountant Anand (Kunal Khemu) tries to cheer up his girlfriend Neha (Soha Ali Khan) on her birthday. Neha is a wannabe actress whom Anand takes to a 5-star restaurant for her birthday. Raj meets Ratan (Asrani) at the restaurant. Ratan is the manager of famous Bollywood actor Aryan Kapoor (Sonu Sood), and Raj has come to see Ratan to sign a movie deal with Aryan.

Raj and Ratan buy as much food as they can, and put the bill on Anand, who cannot pay and is sent to jail. When he comes out, Anand is eager for revenge, and sees Raj shoplifting. Raj goes over to Aryan and Ratan, and right when he gets the movie contract papers out, an Inspector Avtar Gill shows up and arrests Raj for shoplifting, which was recorded by Anand. Raj escapes from jail only to get attacked, and he is saved by Anand. Anand and Raj come up with a movie plan together, to put money towards a film and ensure it is a flop. They collect a lot of money and pretend to be rich and wealthy men to show off in front of Aryan, who signs the papers, and gets in the movie. Anand and Raj try to make the movie as bad as they can to get their share on money, but they don't know that each of them has a different plan.

They borrow money from a well known gangster to finance the movie. They use Neha for the actress role, because Anand knows that with Neha in the film, it will definitely be a flop. While the movie is filming, they contact Asharraff (Johnny Lever) to be the writer, who mixes up Sholay, Dilwale Dulhania Le Jayenge, Gadar, and Lagaan (in that order). At the premier, the film is declared as a "hit," and the assassins get ready to kill them both. When Raj is about to escape with the money, he finds that Anand has already looted all the money. Both, on the run, meet each other while looking for a hiding place, and both decide there is no better place to hide than Jail itself. The two run in jail for making a fraud film and looting money. Once they come out of jail, the two embrace in friendship, and Neha Anand reunites, and everyone decides to make another film.

Cast

 Kunal Khemu as Anand Pawar
 Paresh Rawal as Raj Chopra (Raj Ji)
 Sonu Sood as Aryan Kapoor / Veeru / Shivaswamy Muthuswamy Chinnaswamy Muralitharan / Vijay Bol Bachchan / Ganesh Gonzales (4 times role)
 Soha Ali Khan as Neha Chattopadhyay / Chulbuli Basanti
 Dilip Joshi as Mama Nautanki
 Johnny Lever as Parvez Asharraf Ali / Daku Rubber Singh aka Daku Baba
 Asrani as Ratan Ji
 Hrishitaa Bhatt as Riya
 Amit Thakur as Rishikesh Bajaj
 Deepal Shaw as Lolo
 Razak Khan as Usman Khujli

Soundtrack

 Dhoondte Reh Jaaoge – Sonu Nigam
 Pal Yeh Aane Wala Pal – Neeraj Shridhar
 Salma-O-Salma – Palash Sen
 I Am Falling in Love – Wajid
 Nako-Re-Nako – Wajid, Javed Ali
 Apne Ko Paisa Chahiye – Wajid, Sowmya Raoh
 Instrumental – Sajid

References

External links 
 
 
 
 
 

2009 films
2000s Hindi-language films
Films scored by Sajid–Wajid
UTV Motion Pictures films
Films about Bollywood
Indian remakes of American films
Indian parody films
Sholay
India–Pakistan relations in popular culture
Films directed by Umesh Shukla